Éternité Bay (meaning Eternity Bay) is a bay located south of the Saguenay Fjord at Rivière-Éternité, Quebec, Canada. It is part of Saguenay Fjord National Park.

Geography 
The Éternité River drains into it at the head of the bay.

Two capes are at the mouth of the bay along the Saguenay: Cap Trinité to the northwest, Cap Éternité at the South-East.

History 
On Cap Trinité is the statue of Notre-Dame-du-Saguenay.

References

External links

Bays of Quebec
Le Fjord-du-Saguenay Regional County Municipality
Landforms of Saguenay–Lac-Saint-Jean